St. Michael the Archangel Parish - designated for Polish immigrants in Derby, Connecticut, United States.

 Founded in 1905. It is one of the Polish-American Roman Catholic parishes in New England in the Archdiocese of Hartford.

History 
Bishop of Hartford Michael Tierney  established St. Michael the Archangel Parish on July 15, 1905. Fr. Stanislaus Konieczny C.M., of the Vincentian Fathers, was appointed founding pastor. Durrschmidt Hall on lower Main St. was rented for Masses, the first of which was celebrated on August 20, 1905. A new church was dedicated on July 4, 1907, by Fr. John Synnott, who represented Bishop of Hartford Michael Tierney. The architect was Joseph A. Jackson of Waterbury CT.

Bibliography 
 
 The Official Catholic Directory in USA

External links 
 St. Michael the Archangel - Diocesan information
 Archdiocese of Hartford
 St. Michael the Archangel - Discovermass.com

Roman Catholic parishes of Archdiocese of Hartford
Polish-American Roman Catholic parishes in Connecticut
Congregation of the Mission
Buildings and structures in Derby, Connecticut
Churches in New Haven County, Connecticut